Georgetown Hundred is a hundred in Sussex County, Delaware, United States. Georgetown Hundred was formed in 1863 from Broadkill Hundred. Its primary community is Georgetown.

References

Hundreds in Sussex County, Delaware